The Lomstjønna Nature Reserve is located on Harøya island in the municipality of Ålesund in Møre og Romsdal county, Norway.

The area received protection in 1988 "to preserve an important wetland area with associated plant communities, bird life and other wildlife," according to the conservation regulations. The reserve is based around a pond named Lomstjørna (a.k.a. Lomstjønna), located in a hilly and nutrient-poor bog landscape that is flat and uniform. The area encompasses the main pond, the bog, and several small ponds, and it forms a representative part of this landscape type on the island. Several bird species that prefer coastal heaths nest here: the greylag goose, European golden plover, sandpipers, and gulls. There are also some ducks and some special species such as the red-necked phalarope and Lapland longspur.

The reserve is one of six natural areas that were included in the Harøya Wetlands System Ramsar site, which was established in 1996.

References

External links
 Mijlø-direktoratet: Lomstjønna. Map and description of the nature reserve.
 Miljøverndepartementet. 1987. Lomstjønna naturreservat, Sandøy kommune, Møre og Romsdal fylke. 1:5,000 map of the nature reserve.
 Forskrift om vern av Lomstjønna naturreservat, Sandøy kommune, Møre og Romsdal. 1988.

Nature reserves in Norway
Ramsar sites in Norway
Protected areas of Møre og Romsdal
Ålesund
Protected areas established in 1988
1988 establishments in Norway